Mendip is a local government district in the English county of Somerset. The Mendip district covers a largely rural area of  ranging from the Mendip Hills through on to the Somerset Levels. It has a population of approximately 11,000. The administrative centre of the district is Shepton Mallet.

In the United Kingdom, the term listed building refers to a building or other structure officially designated as being of special architectural, historical or cultural significance; Grade I structures are those considered to be "buildings of exceptional interest". Listing was begun by a provision in the Town and Country Planning Act 1947. Once listed, severe restrictions are imposed on the modifications allowed to a building's structure or its fittings. In England, the authority for listing under the Planning (Listed Buildings and Conservation Areas) Act 1990 rests with Historic England, a non-departmental public body sponsored by the Department for Digital, Culture, Media and Sport; local authorities have a responsibility to regulate and enforce the planning regulations.

There are 90 Grade I listed buildings in Mendip. Most are Norman- or medieval-era churches, many of which are included in the Somerset towers, a collection of distinctive, mostly spireless Gothic church towers. The greatest concentrations of Grade I listed buildings are in Wells and Glastonbury. In Wells these are clustered around the 10th-century Cathedral Church of St Andrew, better known as Wells Cathedral, and the 13th-century Bishop's Palace. Glastonbury is the site of the Abbey, where construction started in the 7th century, and its associated buildings. The ruined St Michael's church, damaged in an earthquake of 1275, stands on Glastonbury Tor, where the site shows evidence of occupation from Neolithic times and the Dark Ages. The Chalice Well has been in use since Pre-Christian times. Glastonbury Abbey had a wider influence outside the town: tithe barns were built at Pilton and West Bradley to hold tithes, and a Fish House was built at Meare along with a summer residence for the Abbot (now Manor Farmhouse).

Medieval structures include Farleigh Hungerford Castle, fortified around 1370, and The George Inn at Norton St Philip, used as an army headquarters during the Monmouth Rebellion in 1685, and then as a courtroom to try the rebels in the Bloody Assizes. Manor houses such as the 15th-century Seymours Court Farmhouse at Beckington and The Old Manor at Croscombe. Mells Manor followed in the 16th century and in the 17th century Southill House in Cranmore was built. Ston Easton Park and Ammerdown House in Kilmersdon were both completed in the 18th century. The most recent buildings included in the list are churches: the Church of St Peter at Hornblotton, built in 1872–74 by Sir Thomas Graham Jackson to replace a medieval church on the same site, and Downside Abbey at Stratton-on-the-Fosse, more formally known as "The Basilica of St Gregory the Great at Downside", a Roman Catholic Benedictine monastery and the Senior House of the English Benedictine Congregation. The current buildings were started in the 19th century and are still unfinished.

Buildings

|}

See also
 Grade I listed buildings in Somerset
 List of Somerset towers
 Grade II* listed buildings in Mendip

Notes

References

External links
 Listed building section at Mendip District Council

 Mendip
Lists of Grade I listed buildings in Somerset